New Zealand standard school buildings were largely developed and built in the 1950s, 1960s and 1970s. Following the Second World War, more schools and classrooms were needed to address the pre-existing shortage and to handle the increasing school population with the subsequent baby boom. Using standard designs allowed the demand to be met while reducing construction time and costs.

Primary school designs
For the most part, primary school designs varied between education boards.

Designs included:
Avalon
Canterbury Open-Air Veranda
Canterbury "White Lines"
Canterbury Education Board Unit System (CEBUS)
Canterbury Open-Plan
Dominion Basic
Formula

Secondary school designs

In contrast to primary schools, secondary school designs were standardised nationally.

Nelson Single-Storey
The Nelson Single-Storey is characterised by its single-storey H-shaped classroom blocks with a large toilet and cloak area on one side.:31–33

Studies conducted in 1954 saw the move to separate self-contained blocks in secondary schools. The use of blocks eliminated the need for corridors and the savings in cost allowed enabled assembly halls to be constructed. The result was the Nelson Single-Storey school and the first schools of the type opened in 1957.

Schools built to the Nelson Single-Storey plan include:

 Fairfield College, Hamilton
 Mana College, Porirua
 Riccarton High School, Christchurch
 Rotorua Girls' High School, Rotorua
 Taita College, Lower Hutt
 Tauranga Girls' College, Tauranga
 Waimea College, Richmond
 Westlake Girls High School, Auckland
 Whanganui High School, Whanganui

Nelson Two-Storey

The Nelson Two-Storey is a development on the Nelson Single-Storey design and is characterised by its two-storey H-shaped classroom blocks, with stairwells at each end and a large ground-floor toilet and cloak area on one side.:115–118 The first Nelson Two-Storey schools opened in 1960, with the last schools opening in 1970.

There is also a T-shaped half version of the Nelson Two-Storey block. Often these were built as the first stage of a full block, but in some cases the second half was never built.:115–118 Examples of the half-block exist at Western Heights High School in Rotorua, and Central Southland College in Winton.

Schools built to the Nelson Two-Storey plan include:

 Aorere College, Auckland
 Bayfield High School, Dunedin
 Burnside High School, Christchurch
 Edgewater College, Auckland
 Fraser High School, Hamilton
 Glendowie College, Auckland
 Hillmorton High School, Christchurch
 James Cook High School, Auckland
 Kamo High School, Whangarei
 Karamu High School, Hastings
 Kuranui College, Greytown
 Lytton High School, Gisborne
 Mairehau High School, Christchurch
 Makoura College, Masterton
 Marlborough Girls' College, Blenheim
 Massey High School, Auckland
 Melville High School, Hamilton
 Nayland College, Nelson
 Newlands College, Wellington
 Otumoetai College, Tauranga
 Rosehill College, Auckland
 Spotswood College, New Plymouth
 Taradale High School, Napier
 Tararua College, Pahiatua
 Tawa College, Wellington
 Tokoroa High School, Tokoroa
 Upper Hutt College, Upper Hutt
 Western Heights High School, Rotorua
 Westlake Boys High School, Auckland

S68 

The S68 is characterised by its single-storey classroom blocks of cinderblock or masonry construction, featuring low-pitched roofs and internal open courtyards.:43–46

The prototype S68 school was Porirua College, opened in 1968. The first standard S68 schools opened in 1971, with the last schools opening around 1978.

Schools built to the S68 plan include:

 Aotea College, Porirua
 Ashburton College, Ashburton
 Aurora College, Invercargill
 Awatapu College, Palmerston North
 Birkenhead College, Auckland
 Bream Bay College, Ruakaka
 Forest View High School, Tokoroa
 Green Bay High School, Auckland
 Havelock North High School, Havelock North
 Hawera High School, Hawera
 Hillcrest High School, Hamilton
 Hornby High School, Christchurch
 Howick College, Auckland
 Kaiapoi High School, Kaiapoi
 Logan Park High School, Dunedin
 Long Bay College, Auckland
 Mangere College, Auckland
 Paraparaumu College, Paraparaumu
 Rotorua Lakes High School, Rotorua
 Tamatea High School, Napier
 Tangaroa College, Auckland
 Tikipunga High School, Whangarei
 Trident High School, Whakatane
 Tuakau College, Tuakau
 Wainuiomata High School, Lower Hutt
 Waiopehu College, Levin
 Waitakere College, Auckland

References

See also
Light Timber Construction schools in Victoria, Australia

Lists of schools in New Zealand
1950s architecture in New Zealand
1960s architecture in New Zealand
1970s architecture in New Zealand